Gymnocranius audleyi, the collared large-eye bream, is a species of emperor native to the Pacific Ocean off the coast of southern Queensland, Australia and also found in the southern part of the Great Barrier Reef. It is a carnivorous species, feeding on benthic invertebrates. This species can reach a length of  TL though most do not exceed  TL. Mostly silver in color, often with brownish tones or markings on the sides. This species is of minor importance to local commercial fisheries, though it occasionally has an unpleasant iodine flavor to the flesh.

References

Lethrinidae
Fauna of Queensland
Fish described in 1916